The 2002 Asian Men's Handball Championship was the tenth Asian Championship. It took place from 10 to 19 February 2002 in Isfahan, Iran. The championship was held in Isfahan's Pirouzi Arena. It acted as the Asian qualifying tournament for the 2003 World Men's Handball Championship.

Draw

Preliminary round
All times are local (UTC+3:30).

Group A

Group B

Placement 5th/6th

Final round

Semifinals

Bronze medal match

Gold medal match

Final standing

All-star team
Goalkeeper: 
Left wing: 
Left back: 
Pivot: 
Centre back: 
Right back: 
Right wing:

References
Results
www.asianhandball.com

Asian
Handball
Handball
Asian Handball Championships
February 2002 sports events in Asia